The Mala Rijeka Viaduct (literally Little river) is a viaduct on the Belgrade–Bar railway, located some 20 km north of Podgorica, Montenegro.

Overview 

The project was started in 1969 and was completed in 1973.
It is also the longest bridge on the Belgrade–Bar railway.

When constructed it was the highest railway bridge in the world, surpassing the record height previously held by the Fades viaduct in France. It held the record until 2001 when the Beipan River Shuibai Railway Bridge, a concrete arch bridge, was completed in Guizhou, China. Multiple railway bridges under construction in China will also be higher.

Construction 
36,000 m³ of concrete and 100,000 tonnes of steel were built into the bridge. The largest of four pillars, upon which the bridge lies, has a base bigger than a tennis court.

Belgian extreme sportsman Cedric Dumont was the first person ever to jump from the bridge on 11 September 2008.

See also 
 List of tallest bridges

References

External links 
 
 Cedric Dumont base jumping from the viaduct

Bridges in Montenegro
Viaducts
Railway bridges in Montenegro
Bridges completed in 1973